Xiyuan (Chinese: , Xīyuàn, unless otherwise noted) may refer to:

 Western Garden (Taiye Lake) or Xiyuan, a former imperial garden located beside Taiye Lake west of the Forbidden City, in Xicheng District, Beijing
 Xiyuan, Haidian District, Beijing, area in Qinglongqiao Subdistrict, Haidian District, Beijing
 Xiyuan Subdistrict, Jinjiang 
 Xiyuan Subdistrict, Shijiazhuang, in Xinhua District, Shijiazhuang, Hebei
 Xiyuan Subdistrict, Fuxin, in Xihe District, Fuxin, Liaoning
 Xiyuan Subdistrict, Weihai, in Huancui District, Weihai, Shandong
 Xiyuan Subdistrict, Kunming, in Xishan District, Kunming, Yunnan
 Xiyuan Temple, or Xiyuan Jiechuanglü Temple, in Wuzhong District, Suzhou, Jiangsu
 Xiyuan Township, Jianning County, Fujian
 Xiyuan Township, Xianyou County, Fujian
 Xiyuan Township, Zhangping, Fujian
 Xiyuan Township, Jiangxi, in Duchang County

See also
 Xiyuan station (disambiguation)